Wall of Sound is the twelfth studio album by the American guitarist Marty Friedman, released on August 4, 2017, through Prosthetic Records.

Track listing

Personnel 
 Marty Friedman - guitars, bass
 Kiyoshi - bass
 Anup Sastry - drums
 Hiyori Okuda - cello (Self Pollution, Sorrow And Madness, Streetlight, The Soldier, Last Lament)
 Nicolas Farmakalidis - piano (Sorrow And Madness)
 Tatsuya Nishiwaki - piano (Sorrow And Madness, Streetlight, The Blackest Rose, Miracle)
 Jinxx - violin

Charts

References

2017 albums
Marty Friedman albums
Prosthetic Records albums
Instrumental rock albums